Gleason Corporation is a prominent machine tool builder based in Rochester, New York, USA. It has manufacturing plants in the USA, Britain, India, China, Switzerland and Germany, and sales offices in those and additional countries.

Gleason's importance lies in gear manufacturing — especially in building the machine tools that themselves cut the teeth. These gears and these machines are sold to industrial customers in a wide variety of fields, such as companies in the automotive and aerospace industries.

History

The Gleason Works, the machine shop that eventually evolved into the Gleason Corporation, was founded by Irish immigrant William Gleason in 1865 after his previous experience in other machine shops.

An important product came in 1874 with William's invention of the first bevel gear planer, a planer with integral indexing head designed to specialize in planing bevel gears. Planers and indexing heads had been combined before, but never in the winning form factor that William created specifically for gears.

Willam's daughter Kate was integral to the company's early operations, along with brothers James E. and Andrew C. She was an early leader in demonstrating that cultural bias against women (or condescending patronizing of women) was not founded in reality, and that women could hold demanding positions in mechanical engineering and sales engineering.

After engineers at Packard developed spiral bevel gears, Gleason pioneered the machine tools to mass-produce them (with automotive differentials being the primary market). Packard and Gleason settled an infringement lawsuit regarding Packard's patents ( and ) and Gleason's patent.

In 1927, Gleason Works again led the innovation in this market, as it was the first machine tool builder to create machine tools to cut hypoid gears (which are an advanced variant of spiral bevel gears).

Organizational structure

Gleason was a publicly traded company under the symbol 'GLE' on the New York Stock Exchange. In December 1999, it agreed to be acquired by its chairman and chief executive, the senior management, the Gleason Foundation, and private equity firm Vestar Capital Partners.

There are multiple companies under the Gleason Corporation umbrella:

 The Gleason Works: The original company, located at Rochester, NY.
 Gleason Automation Systems: Formerly Distech Systems, acquired in 2014, located in Rochester, NY.  
 Gleason Plastic Gears: Specializing in Precision Plastic Gearing, acquired in 2011, located in Bergen, NY.
 Gleason-Pfauter Maschinenfabrik GmbH: Originally 'Pfauter', based in Ludwigsburg, Germany, acquired by Gleason Corporation in 1997.
 Gleason-Hurth Maschinen und Werkzeuge GmbH: Located at Munich, Germany.
 Gleason Cutting Tools Corporation: Located at Loves Park, Illinois, USA
 Gleason Cutting Tools: Located at Eisenbach, Germany.
 Gleason Works (India) Private Limited: Located at Bangalore, India.
 Gleason Metrology Systems: A company specializing in Gear Metrology Products, acquired in 2005, based in Dayton, OH.
 Gleason Switzerland AG: Machine tool manufacturing for cylindrical gears based in Studen, Switzerland
 Gleason Gear Technology (Suzhou) Co. Ltd: A 'Wholly Owned Foreign Enterprise' founded by the Gleason Corporation in Jiangsu, China in 2006.

References

External links
 Official Gleason Corporation website
 Official Gleason Automation Systems website

History of Rochester, New York
Companies based in Rochester, New York
Machine tool builders